Broccoli slaw is a salad that is a variation of traditional coleslaw, prepared using shredded raw broccoli stalks substituted for cabbage. It may also contain mayonnaise, carrots, vinegar or lemon juice, sugar, salt and pepper. It is commonly served at potlucks or "covered dish" parties. It is also called broccoli cole slaw or broccoli slaw salad.

Broccoli slaw is sometimes served with ramen, as cook Paula Deen suggests. Classic broccoli slaw is made with a considerable amount of mayonnaise.  A modern modified recipe removes the ramen noodles that were popular in the Southern United States in the 1960s, keeps the mayonnaise, and uses almonds.

See also
 List of salads
 Raw food

References

Salads
Vegetable dishes
Brassica oleracea dishes